Dance of fire may refer to:
 a fire performance including fire.
 Dance of Fire, a 1995 album by Aziza Mustafa Zadeh.
 Dance of Fire or La danza del fuego, a 1949 Argentinian film.
 Ritual Fire Dance or Danza ritual del fuego, a movement in the 1915 ballet El amor brujo by Manuel de Falla.